Glenn David Otto Jr. (born March 11, 1996) is an American professional baseball pitcher for the Texas Rangers of Major League Baseball (MLB). He made his MLB debut in 2021.

Amateur career
Otto attended Concordia Lutheran High School in Tomball, Texas. Undrafted out of high school in 2014, he attended Rice University to play college baseball for the Rice Owls. Otto was drafted by the New York Yankees in the fifth round of the 2017 Major League Baseball draft and signed for a $320,000 signing bonus.

Professional career

New York Yankees
Otto split his professional debut season in 2017 between the Gulf Coast Yankees and Staten Island Yankees, going a combined 3–0 with a 1.35 ERA and 30 strikeouts over 20 innings. He spent the 2018 season with the Charleston RiverDogs, recording a 1–1 record with a 3.48 ERA and 8 strikeouts over  innings pitched. Otto was limited in the 2018 season as he dealt with a blood clot in his shoulder. Otto split 2019 between the GCL Yankees and Tampa Tarpons, compiling a 3–3 record with a 3.23 ERA and 74 strikeouts over  innings. Following the 2019 season, Otto played in the Arizona Fall League for the Surprise Saguaros.

Otto did not play in a game in 2020 due to the cancellation of the Minor League Baseball season because of the COVID-19 pandemic. He opened 2021 with the Somerset Patriots, going 6–3 with a 3.17 ERA and 103 strikeouts over  innings. After being promoted to the Scranton/Wilkes-Barre RailRiders on July 13, he posted a 1–0 record with a 4.35 ERA and 12 strikeouts over  innings.

Texas Rangers
On July 29, 2021, Otto, along with Josh Smith, Ezequiel Durán, and Trevor Hauver were traded to the Texas Rangers in exchange for Joey Gallo and Joely Rodríguez. He was assigned to the Round Rock Express of the Triple-A West following the trade, going 2–1 with a 2.70 ERA and 19 strikeouts over 20 innings. On August 27, Texas selected Otto's contract and promoted him to the major leagues to make his MLB debut that night versus the Houston Astros. In his debut, he threw five scoreless innings while recording seven strikeouts. Over six games for Texas in 2021, Otto posted a record of 0–3, a 9.26 ERA, and 28 strikeouts over  innings.

After opening the 2022 season with 3 starts for Round Rock, Otto spent the rest of the season with Texas, going 7–10 with a 4.64 ERA and 107 strikeouts over  innings.

References

External links

Rice Owls bio

1996 births
Living people
People from Spring, Texas
Sportspeople from Harris County, Texas
Baseball players from Texas
Major League Baseball pitchers
Texas Rangers players
Rice Owls baseball players
Gulf Coast Yankees players
Staten Island Yankees players
Charleston RiverDogs players
Tampa Tarpons players
Surprise Saguaros players
Somerset Patriots players
Scranton/Wilkes-Barre RailRiders players
Round Rock Express players